The Court of Criminal Appeal was an English appellate court for criminal cases established by the Criminal Appeal Act 1907. It superseded the Court for Crown Cases Reserved to which referral had been solely discretionary and which could only consider points of law. Throughout the nineteenth century, there had been opposition from lawyers, judges and the Home Office against such an appeal court with collateral right of appeal. However, disquiet over the convictions of Adolf Beck and George Edalji led to the concession of a new court that could hear matters of law, fact or mixed law and fact.

Though the court was staffed with the judges who had shown such hostility (consisting of the Lord Chief Justice and eight judges of the Queen's Bench Division of the High Court), it had a restraining effect on the excesses of prosecutors. During the period 1909–1912, there was an average of 450 annual applications for leave to appeal of which an average of 170 were granted. Of that 170, conviction was quashed in 20 percent of cases and sentence varied in another 22 per cent. Rulings of the court included limitation of the lower courts' ability simultaneously to try multiple defendants, multiple indictments and disparate counts within an indictment. The ability of the prosecution to introduce further evidence after the close of the prosecution case was curtailed as were several prejudicial practices with a defendant's previous criminal record. Further, trial judges' ability to invade the jury's role as trier of fact came under scrutiny, as did the practice of insisting that the defence proceed even in the case of an inadequate prima facie case by the prosecution. The Court also did much to refine and systematise the law of evidence.

On 1 October 1966, the Court of Criminal Appeal was superseded by the Criminal Division of the Court of Appeal of England and Wales.

References

Bibliography

Davies, S. (1949) Journal of the Society of Public Teachers of Law (new series) 425

United Kingdom
Former courts and tribunals in England and Wales
Criminal law of the United Kingdom
Legal history of England
1907 establishments in the United Kingdom
1966 disestablishments in the United Kingdom
Courts and tribunals established in 1907
Courts and tribunals disestablished in 1966